Ikeja Bus Terminal is located at Ikeja, the capital city of Lagos State. The bus terminal is located on the road to the local airport behind the present railway line in the city, and adjacent the state teaching hospital, ikeja general post office, all in the Computer Village neighbourhood.

The facility is sitting on a 10,000 square meter land space equipped with Intelligent Transport system (ITS), fully air-conditioned terminal, food courts, shops, ATM gallery, free WiFi, electronically controlled shades among others. According to reports, The Ikeja Bus terminal also has a large landmass for buses to park and load, large walk way for passengers, street lightning, rest rooms, control tower to monitor activities and greening with adequate exits.

The bus terminal was commissioned by President Muhammad Buhari GCFR on the 29th of March, 2018. In attendance were many other dignitaries starting from the Incumbent governor of the state Governor Ambode, former governor of the state Bola Ahmed Tinubu among others.

The Ikeja bus terminal serves as the epicenter of all transport activities within Ikeja area which serves several number of passengers on daily basis and equally provide access to many destinations like Oshodi, Ojota, Iyana-Ipaja, Maryland, Lekki, Ogba, CMS amongst so many other places.

The government of Lagos state has committed to making the transport system of the metropolitan capital city with an estimated population of about twenty million inhabitants to be more organized and orderly.

References

Public transport in Lagos
Bus stations in Lagos
Buildings and structures in Lagos State